The 2023 Four Nationals Figure Skating Championships included the Czech Republic, Slovakia, Poland, and Hungary. It took place on December 15–17, 2022 in Budapest, Hungary. The results were split by country; the three highest-placing skaters from each country formed their national podiums in men's singles, ladies' singles, pair skating, and ice dancing. The results were among the criteria used to determine international assignments.

Entries

Medals summary

Czech Republic

Hungary

Poland

Slovakia

Senior results

Men

Ladies

Pairs

Ice dance

Junior results

Pairs

Ice Dance

Czech Republic Juniors

Hungary Juniors

Poland Juniors

Slovakia Juniors

References

External links
 
 2023 Four National Championships results

Four National Figure Skating Championships
International figure skating competitions hosted by Hungary
Four National Figure Skating Championships
Four National Figure Skating Championships
Four National Figure Skating Championships
Four National Figure Skating Championships
Four National Figure Skating Championships
Czech Figure Skating Championships
Slovak Figure Skating Championships
Polish Figure Skating Championships
Hungarian Figure Skating Championships